The Williamstown Bridge is a bridge over the Ohio River between Williamstown, West Virginia, and Marietta, Ohio. The bridge carries West Virginia Route 31 and Ohio State Route 60.  U.S. Route 21 was also formerly routed along this bridge.

Original bridge
The original bridge at this site was constructed in 1903.  It was the first inland cantilever highway bridge in the United States and also site of the first strike, in 1902, by the United Steel Workers union.

Current bridge
The current Williamstown Bridge was completed in 1992.  It reuses some of the piers from the prior bridge, although the Marietta approaches were relocated to a new connection with Ohio State Route 7.  This bridge is a continuous truss, the 28th-longest in North America.

See also
List of bridges documented by the Historic American Engineering Record in Ohio
List of bridges documented by the Historic American Engineering Record in West Virginia
List of crossings of the Ohio River

References

External links
Williamstown Bridge at Bridges & Tunnels

Road bridges in West Virginia
Bridges over the Ohio River
Bridges in Washington County, Ohio
Buildings and structures in Wood County, West Virginia
Historic American Engineering Record in Ohio
Historic American Engineering Record in West Virginia
Transportation in Wood County, West Virginia
Road bridges in Ohio
U.S. Route 21
Steel bridges in the United States
Truss bridges in the United States
Interstate vehicle bridges in the United States